The Cave Creek Unified School District is the school district serving Cave Creek and Carefree, Arizona, as well as the northern portion of Scottsdale and  a sliver of eastern Phoenix.  It operates one high school (Cactus Shadows High School), one middle school (Sonoran Trails), and five elementary schools (Lone Mountain Elementary School, Black Mountain Elementary School, Horseshoe Trails Elementary School, Desert Willow Elementary School, and Desert Sun Academy). A second middle school, Desert Arroyo, was closed in May 2010.

Standardized testing

Horseshoe Trails tested with the highest scores in the ELA portion and the math portion.
Desert Sun got the least score out of the elementary schools in both portions.
Cactus Shadows got the least score on both portions out of all of the schools.

References

External links
 

School districts in Arizona